I Gotta Be Me is the only album by the late hip-hop producer Johnny "J" on Shade Tree Records, with distribution by Solar Records by way of their recently formed independent label distribution unit, The J. Hines Company.

I Gotta Be Me was an album that explored Johnny J's lyrical skills and abilities as well as his experiences in life, love, sex, relationships, and music, and was also the first appearance of the gangsta-themed female Hip-Hop/R&B quartet Y?N-Vee, who soon after recorded with Johnny J's friend 2Pac and his affiliate group, Thug Life, and released their one and only album for PMP Records, the same label that launched the career of R&B star Montell Jordan a year later.  I Gotta Be Me spawned two singles -- "Get Away From Me" and the Bass rap cut, "Diggin Um' Out".

The musical backing track of the song "Better Off" was later recycled into the tune "Picture Me Rollin'" by Tupac for his album All Eyez On Me in 1996.

Track listing

Album singles

1994 debut albums
Hip hop albums by American artists
Albums produced by Johnny "J"